Darren Keith (Daz) Sumner (born 14 March 1968 in Stockport, England) is a former motorcycle speedway rider who was British Speedway Under 21 Champion in 1987.

He rode in the National League for the Stoke Potters between 1985 and 1987, and went on to ride for Middlesbrough Bears, Belle Vue Aces, and Oxford Cheetahs before retiring in 1994.

References

1968 births
Living people
British speedway riders
English motorcycle racers
Sportspeople from Stockport
Stoke Potters riders